Marco Antonio Angulo Álvarez (born May 22, 1991, in Ahome, Sinaloa), known as Marco Angulo, is a Mexican former professional association football (soccer) player who last played for Santos de Soledad, and currently manages Aguacateros de Peribán F.C.

References

1991 births
Living people
People from Ahome Municipality
Footballers from Sinaloa
Irapuato F.C. footballers
Liga MX players
Association football forwards
Mexican footballers